Lake Sainte-Anne is a lake and reservoir on the Toulnustouc River in the territory of Côte-Nord, Quebec, Canada.
The original dam was built in 1950 to regulate the river flow as part of the Manicouagan River hydroelectric power complex.
A new dam was completed in 2005 that enlarged the reservoir and supported the new Toulnustouc generating station.

First dam

Its purpose was to regulate the flow of water in the Toulnustouc River that powers the downstream Manic-2, Manic-1 and older McCormick hydroelectric plants.
Manic-1 and Manic-2 are owned by Hydro-Québec and McCormick by the Manicouagan Hydroelectric Company.
The Manic 2 generating station was built near Baie-Comeau where the Manicouagan River meets the Saint Lawrence River.

There is also a dyke in the southeast of the lake.
This was repaired to reduce leakage as part of the new dam project.

Second dam

A new dam  and  dyke were built for the Toulnustouc hydroelectric project to enlarge the existing Lac-Sainte-Anne reservoir.
The old dam was above PK80 on the river, while the new dam was between PK65 and PK70.

A tunnel was built from the end of the south dyke to carry water to the hydroelectric plant, which is just below PK55 on the river.
The old dam was destroyed after the new dam was closed.

Impact of second dam

The flooding only affected the wintering area of one moose, which moved to a new location.
Smaller mammals such as hare, porcupine, squirrel, marten, otter and beaver moved about normally to avoid the rising water and found refuge in the forest around the edge of the reservoir.
Predators such as wolf, fox and lynx patrolled the waterline in search of prey.
The overall impact on wildlife seems to have been minor.

Observations in the summer of 2005 showed there had been no significant impact on fish densities in the reduced flow area.
In the new part of the lake there is a deficit of oxygen at deeper levels and there is higher phosphorus content at al levels.
These phenomena are due to decomposition of vegetation that had not been cleared before flooding, and were not expected to last more than a few years.
Measures in the summer of 2005 showed that fish were quickly populating the new part of the lake.
Fish samples were made in 2005, 2007 and 2009, with notes of the length, weight, possible abnormalities and parasites, particularly brook trout.
The results showed that the numbers and size of the fish in the river and the reservoir had not been affected, and if anything the fish were larger.

Notes

Sources

 

 

Lakes of Côte-Nord
Manicouagan-Outardes hydroelectric project